The 1955–56 Challenge Cup was the 55th staging of rugby league's oldest knockout competition, the Challenge Cup.

First round

Second round

Quarterfinals

Semifinals

Final
In the Challenge Cup tournament's final St. Helens faced Halifax. Played on 28 April 1956 at Wembley Stadium in front of a crowd of 79,341, St Helens won 13-2.  This was Saints' first Challenge Cup final win in five Final appearances. Alan Prescott, their prop forward was awarded the Lance Todd Trophy for man-of-the-match.

The St Helens team was greeted enthusiastically upon their return to the North. After detraining at Liverpool the team's open-top coach ride to St Helens attracted an estimated 100,000 people despite pouring rain.

References

Challenge Cup
Challenge Cup